Binacua or Binacúa is a hamlet located in the municipality of Santa Cruz de la Serós, in Huesca province, Aragon, Spain. As of 2020, it has a population of 31.

Geography 
Binacua is located 83km north-northwest of Huesca.

References

Populated places in the Province of Huesca